Kut Chap is a district (amphoe) in the western part of Udon Thani province, northeastern Thailand.

Geography
Neighboring districts are (from the north clockwise): Ban Phue, Mueang Udon Thani and Nong Wua So of Udon Thani Province; Na Klang and Suwannakhuha of Nong Bua Lamphu province

History
The minor district (king amphoe) was created on 20 July 1972, when the three tambons, Kut Chap, Pa Kho, and Chiang Pheng, were split off from Mueang Udon Thani district. It was upgraded to a full district on 8 September 1976.

Administration
The district is divided into seven sub-districts (tambons), which are further subdivided into 94 villages (mubans). There are four townships (thesaban tambons), Chiang Pheng, Sang Ko, and Tan Lian each covers parts of the same-named tambons, and Kut Chap covers parts of tambons Kut Chap and Mueang Phia. There are a further seven tambon administrative organizations (TAO).

References

External links
amphoe.com

Kut Chap